Thomas Alexander O'Brien (1888–1948) was a New Zealand cinema owner and entrepreneur. He was born in Thames, Coromandel, New Zealand in 1888.

References

1888 births
1948 deaths
20th-century New Zealand businesspeople
People from Thames, New Zealand